Elite Plaza Business Center, also referred to as the Khorenatsi 15, is a business center in the financial center of Armenia's capital Yerevan opened in February 2013. With its 18 floors and 21,700 sq.m. of office space Elite Plaza is the largest business center in Armenia.

History
The building was constructed by Elite Group, completed in January 2013 and opened on 16 February 2013. International Finance Corporation (IFC), a member of the World Bank Group, joined forces with the European Bank for Reconstruction and Development (EBRD) to facilitate development of business infrastructure and create employment in Armenia by supporting construction of Elite Plaza, the first high-class multipurpose office building in Yerevan. IFC and EBRD provided loans of $5.4 million and $3.6 million, respectively, to Elite Group, a leading property development company with operations in Armenia and Georgia, to build an 18-storey building that will accommodate office, retail, conference, and exhibition areas to meet the growing demand for high-quality office space in Armenia.

In 2016 journalist Liana Aghajanian described Elite Plaza in the following terms: "Its gaudy green finish and overbearing, odd shape, however, make it symbolic of rapid architectural changes the city is going through, losing its historical buildings to a flashy attempt at a contemporary “elite” style."

Tenants

Elite Group 
ACRA CREDIT REPORTING CJSC 
ALPHA GROUP LLC 
ALVARIUM LLC 
AraratBank OJSC 
Armenia Export Center CJSC 
Armenian Card CJSC 
“Azatutyun Radiokayan Branch of RFE/RL Inc.” 
BeSofted Group LLC 
Boltat CJSC
Captain Travel Club LLC 
ClinSoft LLC
Council of Europe Office
Dimension CJSC 
EPAM SYSTEMS LLC  
Office of the Financial Mediator's System Foundation 
Flat-Club LLC 
FTC
Garden 5 LLC 
Globbing LLC   
HayTech Solutions LLC 
IBS Consulting Group  LLC 
INECOBANK  CJSC 
INTERALCO LLC 
Intertech LLC 
International Republican Institute   
"SUPPORT TO JAVAKHK" FUND 
Kostandyan & Partners LLC  
Legend International LLC
MalkhasyanShin LLC  
MentorCliq International LLC 
MillHouse LLC
Nersessian  LLC 
NeuroHub Business Academy LLC 
“Nokia Solutions And Networks’’ CJSC 
Representative office JSC “Olainfarm” in Armenia  
OPTYM Armenia LLC 
Riviera Capital CJSC 
Schneider Group LLC 
ICAE LLC
“SKAY MED” LLC 
Solid Insurance LLC
Smart Jump LLC 
Steel Group  LLC
Voyago LLC 
DEPOSIT GUARANTEE FUND 
Infopay LLC 
Restart Insurance LLC
Hundred CJSC
Relevant LLC

Gallery

References

External links
Official Elite Plaza website

Commercial buildings in Armenia
Office buildings in Armenia
Buildings and structures in Yerevan
Companies of Armenia
Tourist attractions in Yerevan
Towers in Armenia
High-tech architecture
Office buildings completed in 2012
Expressionist architecture
Futurist architecture
Postmodern architecture
Armenian companies established in 2012
Retail companies established in 2012
2012 establishments in Armenia